Mirzapur division is a division of Uttar Pradesh state of India. Mirzapur is the administrative headquarters. Currently (2018), the division consists of districts of: 
 Mirzapur,
 Bhadohi 
 Sonbhadra.

Industries

 Bhadohi carpets, Sant Ravidas Nagar -The Bhadohi district is biggest carpet manufacturing centres in India, most known for its hand-knotted carpet. Bhadohi known as also carpet city, Mirzapur
 Mirzapur BhadohiCarpets-The largest carpet manufacturing region in Asia, Sonbhadra
 Churk Cement Factory, 800 T/day.
 Rihand Dam, Sonbhadra Pipri, 300 MW of electricity, Reservoir for power plants.
 Hindalco Aluminium Plant, Renukoot, Alumina refining - 114,5000 TPA, Aluminium metal - 424,000 TPA.
 Kanoria Chemicals, Renukoot, Acetaldehyde - 10000 TPA, Formaldehyde - 75000 TPA, Lindane - 875 TPA, Hexamine - 4000 TPA, Industrial Alcohol - 225 million litres/annum, Aluminium Chloride - 6875 TPA, Ethyl Acetate - 3300 TPA, Acetic Acid - 6000 TPA, Commercial Hydrogen.
 Renusagar Power Plant (Hindalco), 887.2 MW of electricity.
 Obra Dam, 99 MW of electricity, Reservoir for power plant.
 Dala Cement Factory, 3600 T/day.
 Obra Thermal Power Plant, Uttar Pradesh State Electricity Board (UPSEB), 1550 MW of electricity.
 Chunar Cement Factory, Ancillary unit of Dala Cement Factory.
 Anpara Thermal Power Plant, UPSEB, 1630 MW of electricity.
 B.P. Construction Company, Anpara, Sonebhadra
 Singrauli Thermal Power Plant, NTPC Limited (NTPC), Shaktinagar, 2000 MW of electricity.
 Hi -Tech Carbon, Renukoot, Carbon Black - 160,000 million tonnes per year.
 Rihand Thermal Power Plant, NTPC, Bijpur, 2000 MW of electricity.
 Finding of Gold Mine in Hills, Mirchadhuri.
 Kanoria Chemicals Power Plant, Renukoot, 50 MW of electricity.
 Obra Thermal Power Plant, UPSEB, 1550 MW of electricity.

Towns in Mirzapur Mandal
Mirzapur, Mirzapur
chunar, mirzapur
Vindhyachal, Mirzapur
Bhadohi, Sant Ravidas Nagar
Suriyawan, Sant Ravidas Nagar
Gyanpur, Sant Ravidas Nagar
Gopiganj, Sant Ravidas Nagar
khamariya, Sant Ravidas Nagar
Renukoot, Sonbhadra
Robertsganj, Sonbhadra
Obra, Sonbhadra
Shaktinagar, Sonbhadra
Chopan, Sonbhadra
Dudhi, Sonebhadra

Major rivers
Ganges
Sone River
Rihand River

Hills and waterfalls
 Vindhya Range Hills
 Matiranga hills
 Windham Water Fall
Mukkha Fall

Popular religious places

Shivdwar, Sonbhadra 
Renukeshwar Mahadev Temple, Sonbhadra 
Vandevi Temple, Renukut 
Jwaladevi Temple, Shaktinagar
 Kantit shareef [Mirzapur]
 Vindhyavasini Temple, Vindhyachal, Mirzapur
 Ashtabhuja Mandir, Vindhyachal, Mirzapur
 Kali Khoh Temple, Vindhyachal, Mirzapur
 Sita Samahit Sthal, Sitamarhi, Sant Ravidas Nagar
 Vaishno devi shaktipith, Dala, Sonebhadra

Historical places
 Vijaygarh Fort, Sonbhadra
 Agori Fort, Sonbhadra
 Chunar Fort , Chunar
 Sodharigarh Durg, Sonbhadra

Major roads and railway junctions
 NH2
 Mirzapur Railway Station
 Gyanpur Railway Station
 Bhadohi Railway Station
 Sonbhadra railway station 
 Chopan, Railway Station
 Renukoot, Railway Station
 Shaktinagar, Railway Station
 Chunar, Railway Station
Anpara Railway station

etc.

Mishri Lal Inter College, Mawaiya, Mirzapur
 Indian Institute of Carpet Technology, Bhadohi, Sant Ravidas Nagar.
 Kashi Naresh Government Post Graduate College, Sant Ravidas Nagar
 Kn Government Post Graduate College, Sant Ravidas Nagar
 Rajkeeya Mahavidyalaya, Sant Ravidas Nagar
 Ram Dev Degree College, Sant Ravidas Nagar
 Smt Kanti Singh Law College, Sant Ravidas Nagar
 Falahe Ummat Girls Degree College, Sant Ravidas Nagar
 Ghanshyam Binani Academy of Management Sciences, Mirzapur
 SHALIGRAM COLLEGE OF ENGG. & TECHNOLOGY Mirzapur
 K.B.P.G College, Mirzapur
 G D Binni P G College, Mirzapur
 K.M College, Mirzapur
 Ramkhelwan Singh Mahavidyalaya, Mirzapur
 Ram Lalit Singh Mahavidyalaya, Mirzapur
 Raj Deep Mahila Mahavidyalaya, Mirzapur
 Krishak Mahavidyalaya, Mirzapur
 Kanhiya Lal Basant Lal PG College, Mirzapur
 Kn Government Post Graduate College, Sant Ravidas Nagar
 Rajkeeya Mahavidyalaya, Sant Ravidas Nagar
 Ram Dev Degree College, Sant Ravidas Nagar
 Smt Kanti Singh Law College, Sant Ravidas Nagar
 Mathura College of Law, Mirzapur
 Pushpa Singh Vidhi Mahavidyalaya, Mirzapur
 Babu Ram Singh Mahavidyalaya, Sonbhadra
 Government Post Graduate College, Sonebhadra
 Sant Keenaram Post Graduate College, Sonebhadra
 Sant Keenaram PG College, Sonbhadra
 Govt. Degree College Chunar Mirzapur
JJIC, Bhurakura, Chunar Mirzapur
KAILASH NATH INSTITUTE OF ENGINEERING & TECHNOLOGY, MIRZAPUR
jokhulal piyaridevi mahavidyalay, newadhiya, bhatewara, mirzapur

References

External links
 

 
Divisions of Uttar Pradesh